Harder may refer to:
Harder (surname)
Harder Fjord, North Greenland
Harder (mountain), mountain near Interlaken in Switzerland, with a viewpoint at the Harderkulm
Harder, Washington, unincorporated community, United States
Harder (fish), or South African mullet 
USS Harder
Harder Stadium, University of California, Santa Barbara
"Harder", a 2002 song by Kosheen
"Harder" (Tiësto and Kshmr song), 2016
"Harder" (Jax Jones and Bebe Rexha song), 2019